Decimo X Aniversario de Misia: The Tour of Misia 2008 Eighth World + The Best DJ Remixes is the fifth remix album by Japanese R&B singer Misia, released June 25, 2008. The release is a two-disc combination of The Tour of Misia 2008 Eighth World DVD and a remixes compilation, The Best DJ Remixes. The Tour of Misia 2008 Eighth World was also simultaneously released as a stand-alone Blu-ray.

Decimo X Aniversario de Misia debuted at #10 on the daily Oricon albums chart and at #15 on the weekly chart, selling 14,026 copies in its first week. It is the 450th best selling album of 2008.

Track listing

Charts and sales

Release history

References

External links 

Misia albums
2008 live albums
2008 video albums
Live video albums
2008 remix albums